Eunidia semirufa is a species of beetle in the family Cerambycidae. It was described by Per Olof Christopher Aurivillius in 1916. It is known from Tanzania and Kenya.

References

Eunidiini
Beetles described in 1916